Darmian may refer to:

Matteo Darmian, Italian footballer
Darmian, Lorestan, a village in Lorestan Province, Iran
Darmian, South Khorasan, a village in South Khorasan Province, Iran
Darmian County, in South Khorasan Province, Iran
Darmian Rural District, in South Khorasan Province, Iran